Patrick or Pat Norman may refer to:

 Pat Norman (activist) (born 1939), American activist and community leader
 Patrick Norman (singer) (born 1946), Canadian country music singer from Quebec
 Patrick Norman (musician), guitarist and backing vocalist of Rusted Root